Sarput (also Romanized as Sarpūt) is a village in Milas Rural District, Central District, Lordegan County, Chaharmahal and Bakhtiari Province, Iran. At the 2006 census, its population was 87, in 15 families.

References 

Populated places in Lordegan County